Taylor's Chapel is an historic chapel located at Baltimore, Maryland, United States. It is a Greek Revival style chapel located in a quarter acre fenced-in plot, which also includes a graveyard, within Mount Pleasant Park in northeast Baltimore. The structure is a small, mid-19th-century country church, built of stone, covered with stucco, painted white, and has a gable roof.  The interior features frescoes on the walls and ceiling, attributed by tradition to the Italian-American painter Constantino Brumidi. The frescoes are trompe-l'œil paintings of classical architectural detailing, including pilasters, panels, coffering, and ornaments. It has remained completely unaltered since its construction in 1853.  It was built as a Methodist chapel by the Taylor family on their Mt. Pleasant plantation.  In 1925 the City of Baltimore purchased the land surrounding the chapel and burial grounds for use as a public golf course.  The site of the chapel and burial grounds was left to a self-perpetuating board of trustees.  Taylor's Chapel is considered the mother church of St. John's United Methodist Church of Hamilton.

Taylor's Chapel was listed on the National Register of Historic Places in 1983.

References

External links
, including photo from 1983, at Maryland Historical Trust
Taylor's Chapel – Explore Baltimore Heritage
Find A Grave: Taylor's Chapel Cemetery
Taylor's Chapel - The Historical Marker Database

Churches in Baltimore
United Methodist churches in Maryland
Properties of religious function on the National Register of Historic Places in Baltimore
Churches completed in 1853
19th-century Methodist church buildings in the United States
Greek Revival church buildings in Maryland
Northeast Baltimore
Baltimore City Landmarks